Odion Obadin (born 2 June/6 December 1988 in Lagos, Nigeria) is a Nigerian footballer who plays for IL Flint. He is a part of the Hausa people.

Career

Singapore

Coming to Gombak United of the Singapore S.League in 2008 on the recommendations of older brother Obadin Aikhena, Obadin was part of the Gombak squad that won the 2008 Singapore League Cup.

Cambodia

Unveiled as one of 2010 Cambodian League winners Phnom Penh Crown's new signings in November 2010, Obadin registered his first goal of the 2011 season in a 5–3 win over Chhlam Samuth, before leaving in late 2012 along with Henry Asonibe, Emmanuel Frimpong, and Kingsley Njoku. After looking for a club in Myanmar, he re-joined Phnom Penh Crown in early 2013, helping them to a third-place finish at the 2014 Mekong Club Championship among other honors which strengthened his unimpeachable status as team captain.

In 2012, the Nigerian defender was refused entry into China on the way to Tajikistan to represent Phnom Penh Crown in that year's AFC President's Cup.

Norway

Trialling for Ullensaker/Kisa IL in 2016, Obadin moved to IL Flint in 2017.

Honors

Singapore

 Singapore League Cup(1): 2008

Cambodia

 Cambodian League(3): 2011, 2014, 2015

References

External links 

 Italian Wikipedia page
 at Soccerway
 at Footballdatabase.eu

1988 births
Expatriate footballers in Norway
Singapore Premier League players
Gombak United FC players
Phnom Penh Crown FC players
Nigerian expatriate footballers
Living people
Association football defenders
Expatriate footballers in Singapore
Expatriate footballers in Cambodia
Nigerian footballers